The Meamu River is a river of Guyana.

See also
List of rivers of Guyana

References
Rand McNally, The New International Atlas, 1993.

Rivers of Guyana